Samoa sent a delegation to compete at the  2008 Summer Olympics in Beijing, China. The country was represented by a total of six athletes. The country's flagbearer during the Games' opening ceremony was weightlifter Ele Opeloge. Samoa won its first Olympic medal due to medals reallocation after the IOC's retesting of doping samples in 2016.

Medalists

Archery

Samoa sent an archer to the Olympics for the first time. Joseph Muaausa earned the nation's first Olympic archery qualifying spot, in the men's competition, by placing second in the 2008 Oceanian championship.

Athletics

Aunese Curreen set a national record in the men's 800 metres, with a time of 1:47.45.

Men

Women

Key
Note–Ranks given for track events are within the athlete's heat only
Q = Qualified for the next round
q = Qualified for the next round as a fastest loser or, in field events, by position without achieving the qualifying target
NR = National record
N/A = Round not applicable for the event
Bye = Athlete not required to compete in round

Boxing

Samoa qualified one boxer for the Olympic boxing tournament. Satupaitea Farani Tavui earned Oceania's qualifying spot in the light heavyweight class by winning the Oceanian continental qualifying tournament. Tavui lost his first match against Croatia's Marijo Šivolija, being eliminated by knockout. He had to be taken to hospital.

Canoeing

Sprint

Qualification Legend: QS = Qualify to semi-final; QF = Qualify directly to final

Weightlifting

References

Nations at the 2008 Summer Olympics
2008
Summer Olympics